Lucas Secon, (born 3 November 1970) also known by the stage name Lucas, is a record producer, songwriter and rapper. He has written and produced for artists including the Pussycat Dolls, Alesso, Britney Spears, Christina Aguilera, Kylie Minogue, Toni Braxton and Mos Def. Secon has won a BMI Award and has been nominated for two Grammy Awards and an MTV Award.

Early life
Secon is the son of Berta (née Moltke) and Paul Secon. His mother is a painter from Denmark and served as the former head of the Danish Academy of Arts; while his father - who was of Jewish descent - was a musician, songwriter, music critic, Billboard reporter, and businessman who co-founded the retailer Pottery Barn. Paul Secon's songs were performed by Nat King Cole, the Ink Spots, Rosemary Clooney, and the Mills Brothers, who recorded Secon's composition "You Never Miss the Water (Till the Well Runs Dry)".

Career

1990–1994: solo career
Signed to Uptown Records by Andre Harrell, Secon debuted in 1990 with the album To Rap My World Around You.

In 1993, he signed with Atlantic Records' East Coast hip hop and dance music record label, Big Beat, and released his 1994 album, the jazz-influenced Lucacentric. It also spawned the single "Lucas with the Lid Off", which peaked at #29 on the U.S. Billboard Hot 100 and became his only Top 40 hit as a solo artist. The music video for the single, directed by Michel Gondry, received a Grammy Award for Best Music Video nomination at the 37th Annual Grammy Awards and a MTV Video Music Award nomination for Best Male Video in 1995.

Songwriting and producing career
Following the release of Lucacentric, Secon moved into music production and songwriting.

Awards and nominations

Lucas Secon has been nominated for Grammy and MTV awards, and in 2010 won a BMI London Award in Pop Music for The Pussycat Dolls I Hate This Part.
 Grammy nomination in Best Dance/Electronica album for "Wonderland" by Steve Aoki
 BMI airplay award for The Pussycat Dolls I Hate This Part

Personal life
Secon's son, Fabian, is also a recording artist

Discography

Albums
1990: To Rap My World Around You
1994: Lucacentric

Singles and EPs
1991: "Show Me Your Moves" - Uptown/RCA
1994: "Wau Wau Wau" - Big Beat
1994: "Lucas with the Lid Off" - Big Beat
1994: "CityZen" - WEA
1996: "Comin’ Out to Play" (featuring Junior Dangerous) - Mercury
2001: "My Feet Hurt" (featuring Blue) - Open-Door Records
2001: "My Feet Work" - Polydor

References

1970 births
Living people
Danish rappers
Musicians from Copenhagen
American people of Danish descent
American people of Russian-Jewish descent
American male musicians
American male songwriters
American record producers